Virtual character may refer to:

 Avatar (computing)
 Game character (disambiguation)
 Embodied agent
 Interactive online characters
 
 
 Virtual actor
 Virtual band, member
 Virtual friend (disambiguation)
 Virtual humans
 Virtual influencer
 Virtual newscaster
 Virtual politician
 Virtual YouTuber

See also
 Virtuality
 Character (disambiguation)
 Virtual agent (disambiguation)